Sullivan is an unincorporated community and coal town in Union County, Kentucky, United States.

References

Unincorporated communities in Union County, Kentucky
Unincorporated communities in Kentucky
Coal towns in Kentucky